In macroeconomics, inflation targeting is a monetary policy where a central bank follows an explicit target for the inflation rate for the medium-term and announces this inflation target to the public. The assumption is that the best that monetary policy can do to support long-term growth of the economy is to maintain price stability, and price stability is achieved by controlling inflation. The central bank uses interest rates as its main short-term monetary instrument.

An inflation-targeting central bank will raise or lower interest rates based on above-target or below-target inflation, respectively. The conventional wisdom is that raising interest rates usually cools the economy to rein in inflation; lowering interest rates usually accelerates the economy, thereby boosting inflation. The first three countries to implement fully-fledged inflation targeting were New Zealand, Canada and the United Kingdom in the early 1990s, although Germany had adopted many elements of inflation targeting earlier.

History 
Early proposals of monetary systems targeting the price level or the inflation rate, rather than the exchange rate, followed the general crisis of the gold standard after World War I. Irving Fisher proposed a "compensated dollar" system in which the gold content in paper money would vary with the price of goods in terms of gold, so that the price level in terms of paper money would stay fixed. Fisher's proposal was a first attempt to target prices while retaining the automatic functioning of the gold standard. In his Tract on Monetary Reform (1923), John Maynard Keynes advocated what we would now call an inflation targeting scheme. In the context of sudden inflations and deflations in the international economy right after World War I, Keynes recommended a policy of exchange rate flexibility, appreciating the currency as a response to international inflation and depreciating it when there are international deflationary forces, so that internal prices remained more or less stable. Interest in inflation targeting waned during the Bretton Woods era (1944–1971), as they were inconsistent with the exchange rate pegs that prevailed during three decades after World War II.

New Zealand, Canada, United Kingdom
Inflation targeting was pioneered in New Zealand in 1990. Canada was the second country to formally adopt inflation targeting in February 1991.

The United Kingdom adopted inflation targeting in October 1992 after exiting the European Exchange Rate Mechanism. The Bank of England's Monetary Policy Committee was given sole responsibility in 1998 for setting interest rates to meet the Government's Retail Prices Index (RPI) inflation target of 2.5%. The target changed to 2% in December 2003 when the Consumer Price Index (CPI) replaced the Retail Prices Index as the UK Treasury's inflation index. If inflation overshoots or undershoots the target by more than 1%, the Governor of the Bank of England is required to write a letter to the Chancellor of the Exchequer explaining why, and how he will remedy the situation. The success of inflation targeting in the United Kingdom has been attributed to the Bank's focus on transparency. The Bank of England has been a leader in producing innovative ways of communicating information to the public, especially through its Inflation Report, which have been emulated by many other central banks.

Inflation targeting then spread to other advanced economies in the 1990s and began to spread to emerging markets beginning in the 2000s.

European Central Bank
Although the ECB does not consider itself to be an inflation-targeting central bank, after the inception of the euro in January 1999, the objective of the European Central Bank (ECB) has been to maintain price stability within the Eurozone. The Governing Council of the ECB in October 1998 defined price stability as inflation of under 2%, "a year-on-year increase in the Harmonised Index of Consumer Prices (HICP) for the euro area of below 2%" and added that price stability "was to be maintained over the medium term". The Governing Council confirmed this definition in May 2003 following a thorough evaluation of the ECB's monetary policy strategy. On that occasion, the Governing Council clarified that "in the pursuit of price stability, it aims to maintain inflation rates below, but close to, 2% over the medium term". Since then, the numerical target of 2% has become common for major developed economies, including the United States (since January 2012) and Japan (since January 2013).

In 2021, the ECB tweaked its inflation target to a symmetrical 2%.

Emerging markets
In 2000, Frederic S. Mishkin concluded that "although inflation targeting is not a panacea and may not be appropriate for many emerging market countries, it can be a highly useful monetary policy strategy in a number of them".

Armenia
The Central Bank of Armenia (CBA) announced in 2006 that it will implement an inflation targeting strategy. The process of full transition to inflation targeting was supposed to end in 2008. Operational, macroeconomic and institutional preconditions for inflation targeting should have been met to ensure a full transition. CBA believes that it has managed to meet all the preconditions successfully and should concentrate on building a public trust in the new monetary policy regime. A specific model has been developed to estimate CBA's reaction function and the results showed that the inertia of inflation rate and interest rate are most vital in the reaction function. This can be an evidence that the announcement of the strategy is a trustworthy commitment. Obviously, there are people who claim that inflation targeting is too restrictive for dealing with positive supply shocks. On the other hand, the IMF claims that inflation targeting strategy is good for developing economies, however it requires a lot of information for forecasting. 

The Central Bank continued to pursue a policy of tightening monetary conditions during the reporting period, increasing the policy interest rate by a total of 2.75 percentage points.  At the same time, about half of the tightening, 1.25 percentage points, was carried out in 2022  in March, reacting to the high inflation situation formed in the case of unprecedented uncertainties.

Being constantly hit by external shocks to the national economy over the past three years, Armenia is still on the path of recovery thanks to economic management efforts. According to the 3-year Stand-By Arrangement, which came to its end on May 16, 2022, important structural and institutional reforms have been implemented. Those include improvement of tax compliance, budget process refinement, strengthening the stability of financial sector and most importantly fostering the inflation targeting framework.

Chile

In Chile, a 20% inflation rate pushed the Central Bank of Chile to announce at the end of 1990 an inflation objective for the annual inflation rate for the year ending in December 1991. However, Chile was not regarded as a fully-fledged inflation targeter until October 1999. According to Pablo García Silva, member of the board of the Central Bank of Chile, this has allowed to attenuate inflation. García Silva exemplifies this with the limited inflation seen in Chile during the 2002 Brazilian general election and the Great Recession of 2008–2009.

Czech Republic
The Czech National Bank (CNB) is an example of an inflation targeting central bank in a small open economy with a recent history of economic transition and real convergence to its Western European peers. Since 2010 the CNB uses 2 percent with a +/- 1pp range around it as the inflation target. The CNB places a lot of emphasis on transparency and communication; indeed, a recent study of more than 100 central banks found the CNB to be among the four most transparent ones.

In 2012, inflation was expected to fall well below the target, leading the CNB to gradually reduce the level of its basic monetary policy instrument, the 2-week repo rate, until the zero lower bound (actually 0.05 percent) was reached in late 2012. In light of the threat of a further fall in inflation and possibly even of a protracted period of deflation, on 7 November 2013 the CNB declared an immediate commitment to weaken the exchange rate to the level of 27 Czech korunas per 1 euro (day-on-day weakening by about 5 percent) and to keep the exchange rate from getting stronger than this value until at least the end of 2014 (later on this was changed to the second half of 2016). The CNB thus decided to use the exchange rate as a supplementary tool to make sure that inflation returns to the 2 percent target level. Such a use of the exchange rate as tool within the regime of inflation targeting should not be confused with a fixed exchange-rate system or with a currency war.

United States
In a historic shift on 25 January 2012, U.S. Federal Reserve Chairman Ben Bernanke set a 2% target inflation rate, bringing the Fed in line with many of the world's other major central banks. Until then, the Fed's policy committee, the Federal Open Market Committee (FOMC), did not have an explicit inflation target but regularly announced a desired target range for inflation (usually between 1.7% and 2%) measured by the personal consumption expenditures price index.

Prior to adoption of the target, some people argued that an inflation target would give the Fed too little flexibility to stabilise growth and/or employment in the event of an external economic shock. Another criticism was that an explicit target might turn central bankers into what Mervyn King, former Governor of the Bank of England, had in 1997 colorfully termed "inflation nutters"—that is, central bankers who concentrate on the inflation target to the detriment of stable growth, employment, and/or exchange rates. King went on to help design the Bank's inflation targeting policy, and asserts that the buffoonery has not actually happened, as did Chairman of the U.S. Federal Reserve Ben Bernanke, who stated in 2003 that all inflation targeting at the time was of a flexible variety, in theory and practice.

Former Chairman Alan Greenspan, as well as other former FOMC members such as Alan Blinder, typically agreed with the benefits of inflation targeting, but were reluctant to accept the loss of freedom involved; Bernanke, however, was a well-known advocate.

In August 2020, the FOMC released a revised Statement on Longer-Run Goals and Monetary Policy Strategy. The review announced the FED would seek to achieve inflation that 'averages' 2% over time. In practice this means that following periods when inflation has been running persistently below 2 percent, appropriate monetary policy will likely aim to achieve inflation moderately above 2 percent for some time. This way, the fed hopes to better anchor longer-term inflation expectations, which they say would foster price stability and moderate long-term interest rates and enhance the Committee's ability to promote maximum employment in the face of significant economic disturbances.

Theoretical questions

New classical macroeconomics and rational expectations hypothesis can explain how and why inflation targeting works.  Expectations of firms (or the subjective probability distribution of outcomes) will be around the prediction of the theory itself (the objective probability distribution of those outcomes) for the same information set. So, rational agents expect the most probable outcome to emerge.  However, there is limited success at specifying the relevant model, and the full and perfect knowledge of a given macroeconomic system can be regarded as a comfortable presumption at best. Knowledge of the relevant model is not feasible, even if high-level econometrical techniques were accessible or adequate identification of the relevant explanatory variables were performed. So, estimation bias depends on the quantity and quality of information to which the modeller has access. In other words, estimations are asymptotically unbiased with respect to the exploited information.

Meanwhile, consistency can be interpreted similarly. On the basis of asymptotical unbiasedness, a moderated version of the rational expectations hypothesis can be suggested in which familiarity with the theoretical parameters is not a requirement for the relevant model. An agent with access to sufficiently vast, quality information and high-level methodological skills could specify its own quasi-relevant model describing a specific macroeconomic system.  By increasing the amount of information processed, this agent could further reduce its bias.  If this agent were also focal, such as a central bank, then other agents would likely accept the proposed model and adjust their expectations accordingly.  In this way, individual expectations become unbiased as much as possible, albeit against a background of considerable passivity. According to some researches, this is the theoretical background of the functionality of inflation targeting regimes.

Empirical issues

Target band size 
While most inflation targeting countries set their target band at 2 percentage points, the band sizes are wide-ranging across countries and inflation targeters frequently update their target bands.

Track record 
Inflation targeting countries' track records in maintaining inflation within the central banks' target bands differ substantially and financial markets differentiate inflation targeters by behaviors.

Debate
There is some empirical evidence that inflation targeting does what its advocates claim, that is, making the outcomes, if not the process, of monetary policy more transparent. A 2021 study in the American Political Science Review found that independent central banks with rigid inflation targeting policies produce worse outcomes in banking crises than independent central banks whose policy mandate does not rigidly prioritize inflation.

Benefits
Inflation targeting allows monetary policy to "focus on domestic considerations and to respond to shocks to the domestic economy", which is not possible under a fixed exchange-rate system. Also, investor uncertainty is reduced and therefore investors may more easily factor in likely interest rate changes into their investment decisions. Inflation expectations that are better anchored "allow monetary authorities to cut policy interest rates countercyclically".

Transparency is another key benefit of inflation targeting. Central banks in developed countries that have successfully implemented inflation targeting tend to "maintain regular channels of communication with the public". For example, the Bank of England pioneered the "Inflation Report" in 1993, which outlines the bank's "views about the past and future performance of inflation and monetary policy". Although it was not an inflation-targeting country until January 2012, up until then, the United States' "Statement on Longer-Run Goals and Monetary Policy Strategy" enumerated the benefits of clear communication—it "facilitates well-informed decisionmaking by households and businesses, reduces economic and financial uncertainty, increases the effectiveness of monetary policy, and enhances transparency and accountability, which are essential in a democratic society".

An explicit numerical inflation target increases a central bank's accountability, and thus it is less likely that the central bank falls prey to the time-inconsistency trap. This accountability is especially significant because even countries with weak institutions can build public support for an independent central bank. Institutional commitment can also insulate the bank from political pressure to undertake an overly expansionary monetary policy.

An econometric analysis found that although inflation targeting results in higher economic growth, it does not necessarily guarantee stability based on their study of 36 emerging economies from 1979 to 2009.

Shortcomings
Supporters of a nominal income target criticize the propensity of inflation targeting to neglect output shocks by focusing solely on the price level. Adherents of market monetarism, led by Scott Sumner, argue that in the United States, the Federal Reserve's mandate is to stabilize both output and the price level, and that consequently a nominal income target would better suit the Fed's mandate. Australian economist John Quiggin, who also endorses nominal income targeting, stated that it "would maintain or enhance the transparency associated with a system based on stated targets, while restoring the balance missing from a monetary policy based solely on the goal of price stability". Quiggin blamed the late-2000s recession on inflation targeting in an economic environment in which low inflation is a "drag on growth". In practice, many central banks conduct "flexible inflation targeting" where the central bank strives to keep inflation near the target except when such an effort would imply too much output volatility.

Quiggin also criticized former Fed Chair Alan Greenspan and former European Central Bank President Jean-Claude Trichet for "ignor[ing] or even applaud[ing] the unsustainable bubbles in speculative real estate that produced the crisis, and to react[ing] too slowly as the evidence emerged".

In a 2012 op-ed, University of Nottingham economist Mohammed Farhaan Iqbal suggested that inflation targeting "evidently passed away in September 2008", referencing the 2007–2012 global financial crisis. Frankel suggested "that central banks that had been relying on [inflation targeting] had not paid enough attention to asset-price bubbles", and also criticized inflation targeting for "inappropriate responses to supply shocks and terms-of-trade shocks". In turn, Iqbal suggested that nominal income targeting or product-price targeting would succeed inflation targeting as the dominant monetary policy regime. The debate continues and many observers expect that inflation targeting will continue to be the dominant monetary policy regime, perhaps after certain modifications.

Empirically, it is not so obvious that inflation targeteers have better inflation control. Some economists argue that better institutions increase a country's chances of successfully targeting inflation. As regards the impact of the 2007–2012 financial crisis, John Williams, a high-ranking Federal Reserve official, concludes that "when gauged by the behavior of inflation since the crisis, inflation targeting delivered on its promise".

In an article written since the COVID-19 pandemic, critics have pointed out that the Bank of Canada’s inflation-targeting has had unintended consequences, with persistently low interest rates over the last 12 years fuelling an increase in home prices by encouraging borrowing; and contributing to wealth inequalities by supporting higher equity values.

Choosing a positive, zero, or negative inflation target
Choosing a positive inflation target has at least two drawbacks.
 Over time, the compounded effect of small annual price increases will significantly reduce a currency's purchasing power. (For example, successfully hitting a target of +2% each year for 40 years would cause the price of a $100 basket of goods to rise to $220.80.) This drawback would be minimized or reversed by choosing a zero inflation target or a negative target. 
 Vendors must expend resources more frequently to reprice their goods and services. This drawback would be minimized by choosing a zero inflation target.

However, policymakers feel the drawbacks are outweighed by the fact that a positive inflation target reduces the chance of an economy falling into a period of deflation.

Some economists argue that fear of deflation is unfounded, citing studies that show inflation is more likely than deflation to cause an economic contraction. Andrew Atkeson and Patrick J. Kehoe wrote,
According to standard economic theory, deflation is the necessary consequence of optimal monetary policy. In 1969, Milton Friedman argued that under the optimal policy, the nominal interest rate should be zero and the price level should fall steadily at the real rate of interest. Since then, Friedman’s argument has been confirmed in a formal setting. (See, for example, V. V. Chari, Lawrence Christiano, and Patrick Kehoe 1996 and Harold Cole and Narayana Kocherlakota 1998.)

Effectively, Friedman was arguing for a negative (moderately deflationary) inflation target.

Variations
Contrast to the usual inflation rate targeting, Laurence M. Ball proposed targeting on long-run inflation, targeting which takes the exchange rate into account and monetary conditions index targeting. In his proposal, the monetary conditions index is a weighted average of the interest rate and exchange rate. It will be easy to put many other things into this monetary conditions index.

In the "constrained discretion" framework, inflation targeting combines two contradicting monetary policies—a rule-based approach and a discretionary approach—as a precise numerical target is given for inflation in the medium term and a response to economic shocks in the short term. Some inflation targeters associate this with more economic stability.

Countries
There were 27 countries regarded by the Bank of England's Centre for Central Banking Studies as fully fledged inflation
targeters at the beginning of 2012. Other lists count 26 or 28 countries as of 2010. Since then, the United States and Japan have also adopted inflation targets although the Federal Reserve, like the European Central Bank, does not consider itself to be an inflation-targeting central bank.

In addition, South Korea (Bank of Korea) and Iceland (Central Bank of Iceland) and others.

See also

Inflationism
Monetarism
Nominal income target
Output gap
Phillips curve
Taylor rule

References

External links
Table of Central Bank Inflation Targets

Inflation
Operations of central banks
Monetary policy